Champagne-Ardenne TGV station (French: Gare de Champagne-Ardenne TGV) is a railway station located in Bezannes, France that opened in 2007 along with the first phase of the LGV Est, a high-speed rail line running from Paris to Strasbourg. It is situated about five kilometres south of Reims; the station is a stop for TGV, Ouigo and TER Grand Est services.

Travel times
27 TGV trains serve the station daily in each direction, for a total of 54 trains per day.

It is directly connected to the stations of: Gare de l'Est, Aéroport Charles de Gaulle 2 – TGV, Marne-la-Vallée – Chessy and Massy TGV in Île-de-France. TGV services connect it directly in Lille-Europe, Rennes (one train), Nantes, Bordeaux-Saint-Jean and Strasbourg-Ville. However, Champagne-Ardenne TGV is not served by the TGV Sud-Est, and there is no direct connection to Lyon and Avignon.

Marne-la-Vallée – 30 minutes
Paris – 40 minutes
Massy TGV – 1 hour
Lille – 1 hour 25 minutes
Nantes and Rennes – 3 hours 15 minutes
Bordeaux – 4 hours 25 minutes

There are also TGV trains to Gare de Reims, the older station in downtown Reims. The station is also served by the Reims tramway, which provides a connection to the city of Reims.

See also 

 List of SNCF stations in Grand Est

References

External links
 

Railway stations in Marne (department)
Railway stations in France opened in 2007